Steve Tomac (born 1953) is a retired Democratic member of the North Dakota Legislative Assembly serving in both the North Dakota House of Representatives (1987–1989) and the North Dakota Senate (1991–2002). Tomac represented Morton County in both North Dakota's 53rd Legislative District (1987–1989) and the 31st Legislative District (1991–2002). He lives in Saint Anthony, North Dakota.

Personal life
Steve Tomac was born in Hettinger, North Dakota, in 1953 and currently works as a farmer-rancher in Saint Anthony. He previously worked as a professional rodeo clown, performing at rodeos from 1971 until 2004. As a rodeo clown, he performed as both a bullfighter, barrel man, and contract specialty act. In August 2008, he was inducted into the North Dakota Cowboy Hall of Fame.

References

1953 births
Democratic Party North Dakota state senators
Living people
Rodeo clowns
People from Adams County, North Dakota
People from Morton County, North Dakota
Democratic Party members of the North Dakota House of Representatives